George Arthur Hastings Forbes, 7th Earl of Granard KP (5 August 1833 – 25 August 1889), styled Viscount Forbes from 1836 to 1837, was an Irish peer and soldier.

Background and education
He was the son of Major-General George Forbes, Viscount Forbes, and his wife, the Viscountess Forbes (née Frances Mary Territt); he succeeded his grandfather, George Forbes, 6th Earl of Granard, as the 7th Earl of Granard in 1837. From his mother's second marriage to Thomas Nugent Vaughan, he had a younger half-sister, Angela Frances Mary Vaughan, who married Sir Frederick FitzWygram, 4th Baronet. He was educated at Eton.

Military career
Granard became the lieutenant-colonel commandant of the 9th Battalion of the Rifle Brigade, and was appointed honorary colonel of the Westmeath Militia on 29 May 1878. He was made a Knight of St Patrick in 1857.

Granard was President of the British Association of the Sovereign Military Order of Malta from 1875 until his death, and was made a Knight Grand Cross of the Papal Order of St. Gregory the Great. He was also a member of the Senate of the Royal University of Ireland. Lord and Lady Granard converted to Roman Catholicism in 1869.

Family
By his first marriage to Jane Colclough Morgan on 2 June 1858, Granard had two daughters:

 Lady Adelaide Jane Frances Forbes (21 Aug 1860 – 18 November 1942), married Lord Maurice FitzGerald.
 Lady Sophia Maria Elizabeth Forbes (21 Jan 1862 – 7 November 1942), married Sir Henry Grattan-Bellew, 3rd Baronet.

By his second marriage to the Honourable Frances Mary Petre, daughter of William Petre, 12th Baron Petre, on 4 September 1873, he had eight children:

 Lady Margaret Mary Theresa Forbes (died 19 May 1965), married Capt. Hon. George Savile, son of John Savile, 4th Earl of Mexborough
 Bernard Arthur William Patrick Hastings Forbes, 8th Earl of Granard (1874–1948)
 Hon. Fergus Reginald George Forbes (20 January 1876 – 18 February 1876)
 Capt. Hon. Reginald George Benedict Forbes (25 June 1877 – 20 May 1908)
 Lady Eva Mary Margaret Forbes (25 June 1877 – 1968)
 Col. Hon. Donald Alexander Forbes (3 September 1880 – 2 August 1938), married Mary Doreen Lawson and had issue
 Lt.-Col. Hon. Bertram Aloysius Forbes (26 May 1882 – 5 August 1960)
 Capt. Hon. Fergus George Arthur Forbes (26 May 1882 – 23 August 1914), killed in World War I

References

External links

1833 births
1889 deaths
Knights of Malta
Knights of St Patrick
Lord-Lieutenants of Leitrim
People educated at Eton College
Rifle Brigade officers
Converts to Roman Catholicism from Anglicanism
Knights Grand Cross of the Order of St Gregory the Great
Earls of Granard